The Christmas flood of 1964 was a major flood in the United States' Pacific Northwest and some of Northern California between December 18, 1964, and January 7, 1965, spanning the Christmas holiday.
Considered a 100-year flood,
it was the worst flood in recorded history on nearly every major stream and river in coastal Northern California and one of the worst to affect the Willamette River in Oregon. It also affected parts of southwest Washington, Idaho, and Nevada.
In Oregon, 17 or 18 people died as a result of the disaster, and it caused hundreds of millions of dollars in damage. The flooding on the Willamette covered .
The National Weather Service rated the flood as the fifth most destructive weather event in Oregon in the 20th century.
California Governor Pat Brown was quoted as saying that a flood of similar proportions could "happen only once in 1,000 years," and it was often referred to later as the Thousand Year Flood. The flood killed 19 people, heavily damaged or completely devastated at least 10 towns, destroyed all or portions of more than 20 major highway and county bridges, carried away millions of board feet of lumber and logs from mill sites, devastated thousands of acres of agricultural land, killed 4,000 head of livestock, and caused $100 million in damage in Humboldt County, California, alone.

History

An atypical cold spell began in Oregon on December 13, 1964, that froze the soil, and it was followed by unusually heavy snow.
Subsequently, an atmospheric river brought persistent, heavy, warm rain. This melted the snow, but left the soil frozen and impermeable. Some places received the equivalent of a year's rain in just a few days. As rivers and streams overflowed and the soil became saturated, mudslides occurred, roads closed, and reservoirs overflowed. Many towns were isolated. By the end of the flood, every river in Oregon was above flood stage, and more than 30 major bridges were impassable.

Late January
Heavy warm rain and melting snow caused more flooding in late January 1965, after the waters had begun to recede from the December flood. More mudslides occurred in places that had withstood the December flooding, and there were more deaths. Many streams in the northern San Joaquin Valley reached higher flows than they had in December.

Effects and aftermath

Oregon

The Christmas flood of 1964 was "the most severe rainstorm to ever occur over central Oregon, and among the most severe over western Oregon since the late 1870s", according to the National Weather Service office in Portland.

Some of the worst mudslides occurred in the Mount Hood Corridor, and one man died in a mud and debris avalanche near Rhododendron that destroyed 15 houses. Other deaths occurred from drowning and electrocution, and one man died when the new John Day bridge collapsed.

Yamhill County was severely affected. The Highway 219 bridge between Newberg and St. Paul, and Wilsonville Road between Newberg and Wilsonville were closed, trapping hundreds of people.

The ports at Gold Beach and Brookings were destroyed.

At Oregon City, Willamette Falls was unrecognizable as a waterfall, and the city was flooded by several feet of water. In Portland, the lower deck of the Steel Bridge was underwater and had also been hit by a log raft consisting of around 1,000 logs. The impact of the raft severely damaged the Hawthorne Bridge, closing it for a year. At its peak, the water was at the top of Downtown Portland's seawall.

Salem Memorial Hospital (now Salem Health) had to be evacuated after waters from nearby Shelton Ditch and Mill Creek flooded the hospital's basement. Hospital staff, parks department employees, and even inmates from the Oregon State Penitentiary placed sandbags around the hospital to prevent floodwaters from coming in. Eventually, the flooding coupled with a loss of power led to the decision to evacuate patients to Salem General Hospital on Center Street. 121 patients were evacuated from Salem Memorial by hospital staff, doctors, ambulance crews, and the National Guard. The hospital was able to reopen five days later after extensive work to repair the flooding damage.

The Southern Pacific (SP) rail line between Portland and San Francisco was out of service for eighteen days as crews repaired damage from landslides near the  Cascade Summit; and the parallel Willamette Pass highway was blocked for several days. Salt Creek washed out  of Oregon Route 58 and undermined the SP viaduct footings. The Willamette River washed out  of SP track between Portland and Albany.

California

Starting on December 21, intense downpours all across Northern California caused numerous streams to flood, many to record-breaking levels. California Governor Brown declared 34 counties in the region disaster areas. Together, Del Norte, Humboldt, Mendocino, Siskiyou, Trinity, and Sonoma counties sustained more damage than the other 28 counties combined. Twenty-six U.S. Geological Survey (USGS) stream gauges were destroyed.

North Coast
The Eel, Smith, Klamath, Trinity, Salmon, and Mad rivers, as well as other rivers and large streams, all went well beyond flood stage and peaked nearly simultaneously around December 21 and 22, breaking previous records (notably those set in the "hundred year" flood of 1955 in most cases). Sixteen state highway bridges were destroyed in California's 1st congressional district, most of them on Highway 101, and another ten county bridges were destroyed in Humboldt County. The flood destroyed  of track with multiple stream and river crossings of the Northwestern Pacific Railroad through the Eel River canyon, the region's only major railroad.

Many communities of Del Norte and Humboldt counties suffered extensive power outages and were left isolated or completely cut off from the rest of the state for a period, including the region's larger populated areas around Humboldt Bay, such as Eureka and Arcata, despite the fact that those cities were located on higher ground and not in the path of raging rivers. Riverside communities like Klamath, Orleans, Myers Flat, Weott, South Fork, Shively, Pepperwood, Stafford, and Ti-Bar were completely destroyed by flood waters; some of them were never rebuilt and none regained their former status. Metropolitan, Rio Dell, and Scotia were significantly damaged. The Pacific Lumber Company sawmill at Scotia lost  of logs and lumber washed downstream. Crescent City, still recovering from the tsunami created by the 1964 Alaska earthquake only nine months earlier, also suffered from the floods.

Over  of rain fell on the Eel River basin in a span of two days. By December 23,  of water rushed down the Eel River at Scotia (still upstream from the confluence of the Van Duzen River),
 more than the 1955 flood, and more than the average discharge of the entire Mississippi River basin.
Just under  of water flowed down the South Fork Eel River alone, causing severe damage along its entire length. Every single stream gauge on the Eel River was destroyed. Signs were later placed on top of tall poles to mark the unusual height of the water.

The town of Gasquet received  of rain over an eight-day period, and Crescent City received .

submerging the town of Klamath under  of water.

The Trinity River, one of the Klamath's largest tributaries, also flooded and wrought destruction along its length. The Trinity, however, did not break the 1955 flood's records because of the newly constructed Trinity Dam, which stored  of runoff from the storm. Nonetheless, an impressive  of water rushed down the river at Hoopa.

Between December 20 and December 26, a staggering  of water flowed into the Pacific Ocean from the combined rivers and streams on the North Coast.

Central Valley and beyond
In the Central Valley, the Yosemite Valley was flooded, and residents of Yuba City were evacuated. Many streams reached record flood stages, including the Feather River, Yuba River, American River, Cottonwood Creek, and Butte Creek. The flood caused the uncompleted Hell Hole Dam on the Rubicon River to fail, sending even more water downstream. In total,  of the Central Valley was flooded.

Elsewhere
In southwest Washington, rising rivers threatened Centralia and Longview–Kelso and closed Interstate 5 and all railways at flooded Kalama for over a week. In Nevada, the Truckee River threatened Reno.

See also

 Great Flood of 1862
 Willamette Valley Flood of 1996

References

External links
History of the Christmas week flood from Salem Public Library
The '64 flood story from Mail Tribune
Images of the 1964 flood in Corvallis from the University of Oregon Library digital archives
Images of the 1964 Eel River Flood near Van Arsdale Reservoir from the Potter Valley Irrigation District

Christmas
1964 meteorology
1964 floods in the United States
Floods in the United States
Willamette River
Natural disasters in Oregon
1964
Pacific Northwest storms
Flood
Flood
Eel River (California)
December 1964 events in the United States
January 1965 events in the United States
1965 in California
1965 in Oregon
1965 floods in the United States
1965 meteorology